Onosma fruticosa  is an erect, much branched shrub, 30-100 cm high, young shoots covered with bristles. Leaves alternate, simple, entire, stalkless, oblanceolate, 7-20 x 2-5 mm, thick, margins revolute, with a mixture of short hairs and long scabridulous bristles. Flowers tubular, nodding, solitary, corolla golden yellow, turning brownish with age. Flowers February-May. Fruit of 4 nutlets.

Habitat
Dry hillsides with garigue vegetation on limestone and igneous formations at 0-1100 m altitude.

Distribution
Endemic to Cyprus, locally common in many parts of the island: Akamas (Smyies, Ayios Kononas etc.), Neon Khorion, Paphos, the Oritaes forest (Petra tou Romiou), Aphamis, Oroklini, Dhekelia, Akhna, Cape Greco, Protaras, Stavrovouni, Kotchiatis, Athalassa, Potamia, Agrokipia, the Pentadaktylos range, Cape Apostolos Andreas.

References

External links
http://botany.cz/en/onosma-fruticosa/
http://www.treknature.com/gallery/photo254428.htm
http://www.theplantlist.org/tpl1.1/record/kew-2392818?ref=tpl1

fruticosum
Endemic flora of Cyprus